Sarah Mayling (born 20 March 1997) is an English professional footballer who plays as a defender currently playing for Aston Villa of the FA WSL. She progressed through their centre of excellence.

Career statistics

Club 
As of 3 May 2021.

References

External links
Birmingham City Profile
Soccerway Profile

1997 births
Living people
English women's footballers
Birmingham City W.F.C. players
Aston Villa W.F.C. players
Women's Super League players
Women's association football midfielders